Behind Stone Walls is a 1932 American Pre-Code film directed by Frank R. Strayer and starring Edward J. Nugent, Priscilla Dean and Ann Christy.

Cast
Edward J. Nugent as Bob Clay
Priscilla Dean as Esther Clay, DA John Manson Clay's cheating wife
Ann Christy as Peg Harper, Bob's girlfriend
Robert Elliott as District Attorney John Manson Clay
Robert Ellis as Jack Keene
George Chesebro as Druggett, the blackmailing butler
 Allan Cavan as 	Prosecuting Attorney
 Harold Nelson as	Judge 
 Stanley Mack as	Reporter at Trial
 Vance Carroll as	Reporter at Trial
 Frank Meredith	as	Court Guard

References

Bibliography
 Pitts, Michael R. Poverty Row Studios, 1929–1940: An Illustrated History of 55 Independent Film Companies, with a Filmography for Each. McFarland & Company, 2005.

External links

1932 films
American crime drama films
1932 romantic drama films
American black-and-white films
Films directed by Frank R. Strayer
American romantic drama films
1932 crime drama films
Mayfair Pictures films
1930s English-language films
1930s American films